Hindolvestone railway station was in North Norfolk, England. It was part of the Midland and Great Northern Joint Railway branch from Melton Constable to Norwich. It opened in 1882 and closed in 1959. It served the small village of Hindolveston. The station was spelled with an 'e' on the end although OS maps show it without.

According to the Official Handbook of Stations the following classes of traffic were being handled at this station in 1956: G* & P and there was no crane.

References

External links
 Hindolvestone station on navigable 1946 O. S. map

Disused railway stations in Norfolk
Former Midland and Great Northern Joint Railway stations
Railway stations in Great Britain opened in 1882
Railway stations in Great Britain closed in 1959